The Age of Unreason is a series of four novels written by Gregory Keyes:

 Newton's Cannon (1998), 
 A Calculus of Angels (1999), 
 Empire of Unreason (2000), 
 The Shadows of God (2001), 

Its title is a reference to Thomas Paine's treatise The Age of Reason.
The story spans the late seventeenth and early eighteenth century, with the action moving between England and France, later involving Russia, Austria, the Republic of Venice, and North America. The author makes use of pseudosciences (scientific alchemy instead of our physics) that were popular at the time: using affinity and aether, for example. Some historical characters appear in important roles: Isaac Newton, Voltaire, Benjamin Franklin, Cotton Mather, King Louis XIV of France, Emperor Peter the Great of Russia, King Charles XII of Sweden, and Edward Teach, better known as the pirate Blackbeard.

References

External links
 

Historical fantasy novels
American steampunk novels
Alternate history book series
Science fantasy novels
Cultural depictions of Benjamin Franklin
Cultural depictions of Isaac Newton
Cultural depictions of Blackbeard